Blasting Off is the fifth and final studio album by British rock band Red Lorry Yellow Lorry. It was released on the Sparkhead independent record label in 1991. The band at this point consisted of Chris Reed and a completely new assortment of musicians. They recorded the LP in a Los Angeles studio. Reed broke up the band soon after.

Critical reception
The Rough Guide to Rock called it a "mediocre bookend for a band that once promised (and often delivered) great things."

Track listing
 This Is Energy – 4:34
 It's On Fire – 2:50
 Don't Think About It – 4:51
 Train of Hope – 4:08
 Talking Back – 5:38
 Down On Ice – 2:49
 In My Mind – 3:56
 Sea of Tears – 3:34
 I Can See Stars – 3:46
 Driving Me – 3:19

All lyrics and music were written by Chris Reed, except for "This Is Energy", "Talking Back" and "Down On Ice", written by Reed (lyrics) and Reed/Gary Weight (music)

Personnel
Red Lorry Yellow Lorry:
Chris Reed - vocals, guitar, keyboards
Gary Weight - bass guitar, keyboards
Korky  - beatbox and general braindamage
George Schultz - acoustic drums, percussion
with:
Martin Scott - extra guitar on "Train of Hope"
Sam Bell - percussion on "Talking Back"

References

Red Lorry Yellow Lorry albums
1991 albums